This is a list of works by American jazz musician Stanley Clarke, including a discography and filmography.

Discography

As leader
Albums

Singles

As co-leader/band member 
With Animal Logic
 Animal Logic (I.R.S., 1989)
 Animal Logic II (I.R.S, 1991)

With George Duke
 The Clarke/Duke Project (Epic, 1981)
 The Clarke/Duke Project II (Epic, 1983)
 3 (Epic, 1990)
 Live in Montreux 1988 (Jazz Door, 1993)

With Fuse One
 Fuse One (CTI, 1980) 
 Silk (CTI, 1981)

With Hiromi and Lenny White (As The Stanley Clarke Trio)
 Jazz in the Garden (Heads Up, 2009)

With The Manhattan Project
 The Manhattan Project (Blue Note, 1989)

With The New Barbarians
 Buried Alive: Live in Maryland (Wooden, 2006)

With Jean-Luc Ponty/Al Di Meola
 The Rite of Strings (Gai Saber, 1995)

With Jean-Luc Ponty/Biréli Lagrène
 D-Stringz (Impulse!, 2015)

With Return to Forever
 Return to Forever (ECM, 1972)
 Light as a Feather (Polydor, 1972)
 Hymn of the Seventh Galaxy (Polydor, 1973)
 Where Have I Known You Before (Polydor, 1974)
 No Mystery (Polydor, 1975)
 Romantic Warrior (Columbia, 1976)
 Musicmagic (Columbia, 1977)
 Return to Forever, Live (Columbia, 1978)
 The Griffith Park Band Live
 The Griffith Park Collection (1982)
 Returns (Eagle, 2009)
 Forever [as Corea, Clarke & White] (Concord, 2011)
 The Mothership Returns (Eagle, 2012)

With Stanley Clarke & Friends
 Live at the Greek (Epic, 1994)

With SMV
 Thunder (Heads Up, 2008)

With Vertú
 Vertú  (Epic, 1999)

As sideman 
With Gato Barbieri
 1971 Under Fire (Flying Dutchman)
 1973 Bolivia (Flying Dutchman)
 1975 El Gato (Flying Dutchman)

With Luiz Bonfá
 1973 Jacarandá
 1974 Todo o Nada
 1991 Grandes Compositores

With Chick Corea
 1974 Live in New York
 1976 My Spanish Heart
 1980 Tap Step
 1982 Touchstone
 2017 The Musician [compilation]

With Norman Connors
 1972 Dance of Magic
 1973 Dark of Light
 1993 Remember Who You Are

With Deodato
 1972 Prelude
 1973 Deodato 2
 1975 Deodato Max 20
 1983 Super Fusion 1900
 1984 Deodato
 2000 Odisea del Espacio
 2001 Preludes & Rhapsodies
 2004 Trios
 2005 Beginning
 2006 Todos Sus Grandes Exitos

With George Duke
 1977 From Me to You
 1977 Reach for It
 1984 Rendezvous
 1993 Muir Woods Suite (rel. 1996, live)

With Joe Farrell
 1972 Moon Germs
 1978 La Cathedral Y El Toro

With Mike Garson
 1986 Serendipity
 1989 Remember Love
 1991 Admiration

With Stan Getz
 1967 Sweet Rain
 1974 Captain Marvel 
 1977 At Montreux (rec. 1972)
 1979 Children of the World
 1988 The Lyrical Stan Getz
 2008 Complete Live at Montreux 1972 (rec. 1972 & 1974)

With Dexter Gordon
 1972 Tangerine
 1972 Ca'Purange
 1996 Blue Dex: Dexter Gordon Plays the Blues [compilation]
 1998 The Art of the Ballad [compilation]

With Howard Hewett
 1994 It's Time
 2007 If Only...

With George Howard
 1986 A Nice Place to Be
 1988 Reflections
 1992 Do I Ever Cross Your Mind?
 1993 When Summer Comes

With Freddie Hubbard
 1979 The Love Connection
 1981 Mistral
 1989 Times Are Changing

With Bobby Lyle
 1985 Night Breeze
 1994 Rhythm Stories

With Teena Marie
 1983 Robbery
 1986 Emerald City

With Paul McCartney
 1982 Tug of War
 1983 Pipes of Peace

With John McLaughlin
 1979 Electric Guitarist
 2004 Guitar & Bass [compilation]

With Airto Moreira
 1972 Free 
 1974 Virgin Land
 1989 Struck by Lightning
 1993 Killer Bees
 2000 Revenge of the Killer Bees

With Alphonse Mouzon
 1984 Distant Lover
 1985 Back to Jazz (as The Alphonse Mouzon Band)

With Sunnie Paxson
 2002 Groove Suite
 2011 Bohemian Sun

With Dianne Reeves
 1987 Dianne Reeves
 1990 Never Too Far

With Pharoah Sanders
 1971 Black Unity (Impulse)
 1972 Live at the East (Impulse!)
 1973 Village of the Pharoahs (Impulse!)

With McCoy Tyner
 1979 Together
 1982 Looking Out
 2000 McCoy Tyner with Stanley Clarke and Al Foster
 2007 Afro Blue [compilation]

With Lenny White
 1995 Present Tense
 1996 Renderers of Spirit
 2010 Anomaly

With Tony Williams
 1978 The Joy of Flying
 1996 Wilderness (Live 1995)

With others
 1971 In Pursuit of Blackness, Joe Henderson
 1972 Blues and the Soulful Truth, Leon Thomas
 1972 Dom Um Romão, Dom Um Romão
 1972 The Loud Minority, Frank Foster
 1973 Crankin', Curtis Fuller
 1973 Gypsy Man, Robin Kenyatta
 1973 Illusion Suite, Stanley Cowell
 1973 Butterfly Dreams, Flora Purim
 1973 Child's Dance: Art Blakey & the Jazz Messengers Vol. 1, Art Blakey
 1973 Extension of a Man, Donny Hathaway
 1974 Borboletta, Santana
 1974 The Chicago Theme, Hubert Laws
 1974 In the Cut, Ray Bryant
 1974 Let Me in Your Life, Aretha Franklin
 1974 Two Is One, Charlie Rouse
 1976 Black Rose, J. D. Souther
 1976 I Heard That!!, Quincy Jones
 1976 Ports of the Heart, Jimmie Spheeris
 1976 Land of the Midnight Sun, Al Di Meola
 1977 Killer Joe, Benny Golson
 1977 Loading Zone, Roy Buchanan
 1977 Sweet Bird, Lani Hall
 1977 Just Family, Dee Dee Bridgewater
 1979 I Loved You Then... I Love You Now, Gayle Moran
 1979 Troublemaker, Ian McLagan
 1980 Love at First Sight, Sonny Rollins
 1981 Galaxian, The Jeff Lorber Fusion
 1982 Echoes of an Era, with Chaka Khan, Joe Henderson, Freddie Hubbard, Chick Corea & Lenny White
 1982 Hollywood, Maynard Ferguson
 1983 Spanish Wave, L. Subramaniam
 1983 The Look, Shalamar
 1984 In the Dark, Roy Ayers
 1984 Marathon, Rodney Franklin
 1984 The Big Jazz Trio, George Cables
 1984 The Two of Us, Ramsey Lewis & Nancy Wilson
 1985 Anywhere You Go, David Pack
 1985 Put Sunshine in It, Arthur Blythe
 1986 Illusions, Eliane Elias
 1986 Blue Notes, Helen Terry
 1986 Word Up!, Cameo
 1987 A Sound Investment, Flip Phillips/Scott Hamilton
 1987 Shieldstone, Stanley Clarke & Bill Shields
 1987 All Systems Go, Donna Summer
 1988 Every Step of the Way, David Benoit
 1988 Diamond Inside of You, Rodney Franklin
 1988 Heart's Horizon, Al Jarreau
 1989 Alligator, Leslie West
 1990 First Instrument, Rachelle Ferrell [rel. 1995, re-issue of Somethin' Else (1990)]
 1991 The Comfort Zone, Vanessa Williams
 1992 Precious, Chanté Moore
 1993 Love's Alright, Eddie Murphy
 1994 Smooth, Gerald Albright
 1995 Giving Myself to You, Gerald Albright
 1994 Freudian Slip, Deborah Holland
 1995 Dance of Fire, Aziza Mustafa Zadeh
 1995 Songs from the Key of Life: A Tribute to Stevie Wonder, Najee
 1996 Inner City Blues, Doc Powell
 1996 Laid Back, Doc Powell
 1996 Leopard Son, Stewart Copeland
 1998 Gershwin's World, Herbie Hancock
 1998 Walk Tall: Tribute to Cannonball Adderley, Eric Marienthal
 1998 World According to M.T., Michael Thompson
 2003 In Between the Heartaches, Phyllis Hyman
 2003 Timeless Eliane Elias, Eliane Elias [compilation]
 2004 A Man and His Music, Claus Ogerman [2CD compilation]
 2004 The Trip, Tom Middleton
 2005 Master of All Trades, Marcus Miller [2DVD video]
 2006 Givin' It Up, George Benson/Al Jarreau
 2009 The Playmaker, Mads Tolling
 2011 Ruslan, Ruslan Sirota
 2011 Somos, Kennard Ramsey
 2011 Swing Shift, Doug Webb
 2012 Fusion Best, Ithamara Koorax
 2012 Rhythm Sessions, Lee Ritenour
 2013 Ritzville, Allen Vizzutti
 2014 Morning Phase, Beck
 2017 Elaborations (1982) / Light Blue: Arthur Blythe Plays Thelonious Monk (1983) / Put Sunshine In It (1985), Arthur Blythe [reissue of three albums]
 2017 World Wide Funk, Bootsy Collins

As producer
 1978 Just Family, Dee Dee Bridgewater
 1982 Hollywood, Maynard Ferguson
 1983 I'm Ready, Natalie Cole
 1983 The Look, Shalamar
 1984 Beyond the Clouds, Free Flight
 1984 In the Dark, Roy Ayers
 1984 Marathon, Rodney Franklin
 1984 The Two of Us, Ramsey Lewis & Nancy Wilson
 1984 No Question About It, Kent Jordan
 1986 I Commit to Love, Howard Hewitt
 1988 Diamond Inside of You, Rodney Franklin
 1988 Get Here, Brenda Russell
 1990 Private Flight, Jim Walker

Filmography

Feature films

Television

Television movies

Animation 
 Static Shock 2000
directed by Denys Cowan, Dan Riba

 Waynehead (1996–1997)
directed by Damon Wayans

 Cool Like That Christmas 1994
directed by David Feiss, Swinton O. Scott III

Music videos 
 "Michael Jackson: Remember the Time" 1992
directed by John Singleton

Documentaries 
 Meet Bob Shaye 2004
directed by Jeffery Schwartz

 Maryanne e gli altri (Italy) 1995
directed by Ita Cesa, Giuseppe Selva

References 

Discographies of American artists
Jazz discographies
Pop music discographies
Rock music discographies